Streptomyces seymenliensis is a bacterium species from the genus of Streptomyces which has been isolated from the Tuz Lake in the Seymenli in Turkey.

See also 
 List of Streptomyces species

References

Further reading

External links
Type strain of Streptomyces seymenliensis at BacDive -  the Bacterial Diversity Metadatabase	

seymenliensis
Bacteria described in 2015